Moondust for My Diamond is the second studio album by English musician Hayden Thorpe, released on 15 October 2021 through Domino Recording Company. It was produced by Richard Formby, Nathan Jenkins and Thorpe, and preceded by the single "The Universe Is Always Right", as well as the songs "Metafeeling", "Parallel Kingdom" and "Golden Ratio".

The album was reissued in an expanded edition, called the Every Piece of Dust Edition, on 19 August 2022, from which the song "Polygod" was released as a single.

Background
In discussing the themes of the album, Thorpe explained that he wanted to explore "the meeting point between science and religion, the grand struggle for reality that shapes so much of our time". The album mostly abandons the piano ballad-dominated sound of Thorpe's solo debut album Diviner (2019) in favour of "synths, electronics, and softly-strummed guitars", moving into more overt electronic and synthpop territory. 

Whilst out shopping in Los Angeles on Valentine's Day 2019, Thorpe purchased a Hagström Viking baritone guitar, which reignited his interest in playing guitar and set the impetus for the material that would appear on Moondust for My Diamond. Thorpe stated that "if the piano was my totem instrument for Diviner, then this guitar became the amulet for the new record." Thorpe reunited with Richard Formby, whom he had previously worked with whilst in Wild Beasts, for the recording sessions.

Critical reception

On review aggregator Metacritic, Moondust for My Diamond received a score of 76 out of 100 based on nine critics' reviews, indicating "generally favorable" reception. Ross Horton of The Line of Best Fit gave the album 8 out of 10 and called it a "very close second to its predecessor", 2019's Diviner, noting the difference from the previous album's use of piano, which is swapped out for "synth tones and programmed drums" on Moondust for My Diamond. Horton concluded that the record is "another essential album from a man who couldn't make a bad one if he tried". Writing for AllMusic, Heather Phares remarked that while the album's "smoothness sometimes make [it] a little less immediate than Diviner, it's the perfect complement to that album's somber reflections and another confident step forward in [Thorpe's] creative journey".

Joe Goggins of DIY awarded the album four out of five stars and felt that "on this second full-length from Hayden, there's evidence of real progression. The fairly austere palette that he embraced on Diviner is swapped out for warm, burbling synths" on Moondust for My Diamond. Reviewing the album for PopMatters, Ben Hogwood complimented Thorpe for his songwriting, writing that he has "the confidence to use a 'less is more' approach to powerful effect. Every musical inflection is carefully applied but there remains an instinctive feel", as well as his singing, opining that he "continues to sing beautifully but if anything his slightly reserved approach heightens the emotional impact". Hogwood concluded that Thorpe "has without doubt made one of the albums of the year".

Jeremy J. Fisette of Beats Per Minute found that although the album is Thorpe's "first solo effort that doesn't really sound like a Wild Beasts album", it "still suffers from a bit of a momentum issue", with "some of the lyrics and ideas here feel[ing] a bit undercooked". Fisette stated that while the album "does offer some nice expansions on themes and compositional ideas from his debut[, ...] too much of Moondust for My Diamond gets lost in its own glittery haze".

Track listing

Charts

References

2021 albums
Albums produced by Richard Formby
Domino Recording Company albums
Hayden Thorpe albums